Poali is a census town within the jurisdiction of the Nodakhali police station in the Budge Budge II CD block in the Alipore Sadar subdivision of the South 24 Parganas district in the Indian state of West Bengal.

Geography

Area overview
Alipore Sadar subdivision is the most urbanized part of the South 24 Parganas district. 59.85% of the population lives in the urban areas and 40.15% lives in the rural areas. In the northern portion of the subdivision (shown in the map alongside) there are 21 census towns. The entire district is situated in the Ganges Delta and the subdivision, on the east bank of the Hooghly River, is an alluvial stretch, with industrial development.

Note: The map alongside presents some of the notable locations in the subdivision. All places marked in the map are linked in the larger full screen map.

Location

Bowali, Chak Kashipur, Chak Alampur, Dakshin Raypur and Poali form a cluster of census towns, as per the map of the Budge Budge II CD block on page 181 of the District Census Handbook 2011 for the South 24 Parganas.

Demographics
According to the 2011 Census of India, Paoli had a total population of 8,657, of which 4,464 (52%) were males and 4,193 (48%) were females. There were 1,131 persons in the age range of 0 to 6 years. The total number of literate people was 5,655 (75.14% of the population over 6 years).

Infrastructure
According to the District Census Handbook 2011, Poali covered an area of 3.4128 km2. Among the civic amenities, it had 7.5 km roads with open drains, the water supply involved service reservoir and bore wells. It had 1,280 domestic electric connections. Among the medical facilities it a nursing home 4 km away and 2 medicine shops.  Among the educational facilities it had were 4 primary schools, the nearest senior secondary school was at Baratala close by, a general degree college at Burul 3.5 km away. Important commodities it produced were paddy and vegetables.

Transport
A short stretch of local roads link Poali to the Budge Budge Trunk Road.

Budge Budge railway station is located nearby.

Education
Saheed Anurup Chandra Mahavidyalaya at Burul is not very far away.

Baratala Poali High School is a Bengali-medium coeducational institution, established in 1965. It has arrangements for teaching from class V to class XII.

Healthcare
There is a primary health centre, with 6 beds, at Gajapoali (PO Poali).

References

Cities and towns in South 24 Parganas district
Neighbourhoods in Kolkata
Kolkata Metropolitan Area